The Gjermundbu helmet  is a Viking Age helmet.

The helmet was discovered during field clearing in 1943 at the Gjermundbu farm near Haugsbygd in the municipality of Ringerike in Buskerud, Norway. Officials at the University of Oslo were later notified.  Conservator Sverre Marstrander and museum assistant Charlotte Blindheim led an investigation  which confirmed the existence of a burial chamber of historic value dating from the Viking era. The Gjermundbu finds (Gjermundbu-funnet) contained many artifacts including  articles of weaponry. The Gjermundbu  helmet was found in nine fragments and was subsequently restored. The helmet was made of iron and was in the shape of a peaked cap made from four plates. It is now on display at the Museum of Cultural History of the University of Oslo.

Together with the Tjele helmet fragment, two fragments from Gotland, and one fragment from Kyiv, it is the only known Viking helmet capable of reconstruction.

See also
Yarm helmet

References

Bibliography
  
 
 
 
 
  
 
  
  
  
 
 
 

1943 archaeological discoveries
Germanic archaeological artifacts
Viking warfare
Individual helmets